Peter Arntz (born 5 February 1953 in Leuth, Gelderland) is a Dutch retired footballer who played as a midfielder.

Club career
Arntz came through the famous Go Ahead Eagles youth system and made his debut for their senior team in February 1971 against Ajax.

He moved to AZ'67 after the 1976 European Championship and twice won the KNVB Cup with them. In 1981, he won the league title with them and he played in both legs of the 1981 UEFA Cup Final which AZ'67 lost to Ipswich Town. May 25, 1986, he played his last match (AZ'67-Haarlem 1-1).

International career
He made his debut for the Netherlands in an April 1975 friendly match against Belgium and earned a total of 5 caps, scoring no goals. He was included in the Dutch squad for the 1976 UEFA European Football Championship.

His final international was a February 1981 FIFA World Cup qualification match against Cyprus.

Retirement
After retiring as a player, Arntz worked as a scout for AZ from 1997 to 2011.

References

External links
 
  Profile

1953 births
Living people
People from Ubbergen
Association football midfielders
Dutch footballers
Netherlands international footballers
UEFA Euro 1976 players
Eredivisie players
Go Ahead Eagles players
AZ Alkmaar players
Footballers from Gelderland